Rhophodon is a genus of small air-breathing land snails, terrestrial pulmonate gastropod mollusks in the family Charopidae.

Species
Species within the genus Rhophodon include:
 Rhophodon problematica
 Rhophodon kempseyensis

References

 Nomenclator Zoologicus info

 
Charopidae
Taxonomy articles created by Polbot